The 1962 Tulsa Golden Hurricane football team represented the University of Tulsa during the 1962 NCAA University Division football season. In their second year under head coach Glenn Dobbs, the Golden Hurricane compiled a 5–5 record (3–0 against Missouri Valley Conference opponents) and won the conference championship. The team's statistical leaders included Stu McBirnie with 1,169 passing yards, Hank Dorsch with 250 rushing yards, and John Simmons with 860 receiving yards.

Schedule

References

Tulsa
Tulsa Golden Hurricane football seasons
Missouri Valley Conference football champion seasons
Tulsa Golden Hurricane football